Konrad Loewe, real name Konrad Löw (6 February 1856 in Prostějov, Moravia – 11 February 1912 in Vienna), was an Austrian actor and playwright.

The son of a merchant, Loewe studied law in Vienna, but changed for the stage in 1878. After stays in Teplice and Olomouc he came to the Konzerthaus Berlin in 1881 and played at numerous other theatres in Germany and Austria. In 1895 he finally became an actor at the k.k. Hof-Burgtheater in Vienna. To his mostly heroic roles belong the figures of Gessler, Musikus Miller, Karl Moor, Hamlet, and others.

He was buried in Döbling Cemetery in Vienna. His wife, the court opera singer Mathilde Loewe, is buried next to him.

References

External links 
 
 Konrad Löwe on Kote-autographs
 Konrad Löwe on Vienna History Wiki

1856 births
1912 deaths
Actors from Prostějov
19th-century Austrian male actors
20th-century Austrian male actors
19th-century Austrian dramatists and playwrights
Moravian-German people
Writers from Prostějov
Burials at Döbling Cemetery